The Manipur State Museum is an institution displaying a collection of artistic, cultural, historical and scientific artefacts and relics in Imphal, Manipur, India. It has galleries housing materials of natural history, ethnology and archeology.

Overview 
The Manipur State Museum houses ornaments, textiles, agricultural equipments of Ancient Manipur, Medieval Manipur and Modern Manipur. The museum conveys an all encompassing picture of the history of the life of the Manipuri people.

History 
The Manipur State Museum was inaugurated by Indira Gandhi, the then prime minister of India on 23 September 1969. It has been expanded to a multipurpose museum. It has many sections and subsections. One prominent section is the ethnological gallery. This gallery was formally reopened by Ved Marwah, the then Governor of Manipur, on 20 January 2001.

Collections 
The most famous piece on display is a Hiyang Hiren, used by the royalties. It is 78 feet in length and is in an open gallery.

Other collection include coins, manuscripts, instruments, pottery, dresses, paintings and ornaments of Ancient Manipur, Medieval Manipur and Modern Manipur.

The Museum has a publication for more than 500 species of rare orchids, out of which only 472 orchids have been identified. Several experts opined that no one comes across anywhere in India with such a variety of orchid species as in Manipur.

The royal Howdah, presently on display in the Manipur State Museum, was personally used by Sir Meidingngu Churachand Singh KCSI (1891-1941 AD), CBE, the King of Manipur.

Exhibits 
The Museum exhibits mainly cultural themes and awareness programs. Some of the exhibits include tribal ornaments, Meitei ornaments, headgears, agricultural implements, domestic implements, hunting tools, smoking pipes and lighters, terracotta pottery, gold and silver utensils, polo saddlery, traditional water pipe, Meitei textiles, Meitei time measuring device, ancient gold mask, caskets, riderless horse statues, arms and armory, basketry, tribal costumes, etc.

The time measuring implements like the "Tanyei Pung" and the "Tanyei Chei" testify the knowledge of the ancient Meiteis in Ancient Manipur civilization.

The costumes exhibited are important to study the social structure of Manipur.

The royal Howdah of Sir Churachand Singh KCSI (1891-1941 AD), CBE, the then King of Manipur, is also displayed in the Manipur State Museum.

The Manipur State Museum also organises workshops for traditional Manipuri sculptors-souvenir.

See also 
 Imphal Peace Museum
 INA War Museum
 Kakching Garden
 Keibul Lamjao National Park - world's only floating national park in Manipur, India
 Khonghampat Orchidarium
 Loktak Folklore Museum
 Manipur Zoological Garden
 Phumdi - Floating biomasses in Manipur, India
 Sekta Archaeological Living Museum
 Yangoupokpi-Lokchao Wildlife Sanctuary

References

External links 

 Manipur State Museum artnculturemanipur.gov.in
 Manipur State Museum www.museumsofindia.org

Meitei architecture
Cultural heritage of India
Landmarks in India
Meitei culture
Monuments and memorials in India
Monuments and memorials in Imphal
Monuments and memorials in Manipur
Monuments and memorials to Meitei people
Monuments and memorials to Meitei royalties
Museums in Manipur
Public art in India
Tourist attractions in India